The 1946 Ottawa Rough Riders finished in 3rd place in the Interprovincial Rugby Football Union with a 6–4–2 record and failed to qualify for the playoffs.

Preseason

Regular season

Standings

Schedule

References

Ottawa Rough Riders seasons
1946 Canadian football season by team